Lectionary 122, designated by siglum ℓ 122 (in the Gregory-Aland numbering) is a Greek manuscript of the New Testament, on parchment leaves. It is dated by a colophon to the year 1175.

Description 

The codex contains lessons from the Gospels of John, Matthew, Luke lectionary (Evangelistarium), on 194 parchment leaves. The text is written in Greek minuscule letters, in two columns per page, 24 lines per page. It contains musical notes.
It is very splendid manuscript.

History 

The manuscript was written by Germanus, a monk, for the monk Theodoret. The manuscript was added to the list of New Testament manuscripts by Scholz.

The manuscript is not cited in the critical editions of the Greek New Testament (UBS3).

Currently the codex is located in the Vatican Library (Vat. gr. 1168) in Rome.

See also 

 List of New Testament lectionaries
 Biblical manuscript
 Textual criticism

Notes and references 

Greek New Testament lectionaries
12th-century biblical manuscripts
Manuscripts of the Vatican Library